The Quick and the Dead is an English phrase originating in William Tyndale's English translation of the New Testament (1526), "I testifie therfore before god and before the lorde Iesu Christ which shall iudge quicke and deed at his aperynge in his kyngdom" [2 Tim 4:1], and used by Thomas Cranmer in his translation of the Nicene Creed and Apostles' Creed for the first Book of Common Prayer (1540). In the following century the idiom was referenced both by Shakespeare's Hamlet (1603) and the King James Bible (1611).  More recently the final verse of The Book of Mormon (first published in 1830), refers to "...the Eternal Judge of both quick and dead".

Etymology
The use of the word quick in this context is an archaic one, specifically meaning living or alive; therefore, this idiom refers to 'the living and the dead.' The meaning of "quick" in this way is still retained in various common phrases, such as the "quick" of the fingernails, and in the idiom quickening, as the moment in pregnancy when fetal movements are first felt.) Another common phrase, "cut to the quick", literally means cut through the dead, unfeeling layers of the skin to the living, sensitive tissues below.
Quicksilver, an old name for the liquid metal mercury, refers to the way droplets of mercury run around and quiver as if alive. It is derived from the Proto-Germanic *kwikwaz, which in turn was from a variant of the Proto-Indo-European form *gwih3wos – "lively, alive", from the root *gweih3 – "(to) live" (from which also comes the Latin vivere and later the Italian and Spanish viva, and whose root is retained in the English words revive and survive). 

The English meaning of "quick" in later centuries shifted to "fast", "rapid", "moving, or able to move, with speed".

In the King James Bible
The phrase is found in three passages in the 1611 King James version of the Bible: in the Acts of the Apostles (Acts 10:42), Paul's letters to Timothy (2 Timothy 4:1), and the First Epistle of Peter. The last reads: "For the time past of our life may suffice us to have wrought the will of the Gentiles, when we walked in lasciviousness, lusts, excess of wine, revellings, banquetings, and abominable idolatries: Wherein they think it strange that ye run not with them to the same excess of riot, speaking evil of you: Who shall give account to him that is ready to judge the quick and the dead".

This passage advises the reader of the perils of following outsiders in not obeying God's will. Specifically it warns that those who sin, both the quick and the dead, will be judged by Jesus Christ. In other words, it implies that God is able to act on the sins of a person whether that person is alive (quick) or has passed into the afterlife (dead).

Shakespeare's Hamlet

This phrase occurs in Shakespeare's tragedy Hamlet, when Ophelia's brother, Laertes, at the burial of his sister, Ophelia, asks the gravedigger to hold off throwing earth onto Ophelia's body and jumps into her grave and says, "Now pile your dust upon the quick and the dead . . . " (line 5.1.240). The expression comes from The Nicene Creed, the New Testament, and the English Book of Common Prayer. Laertes is "quick" (i.e., alive), and Ophelia is dead. The scene dramatizes the extreme passion of Laertes.

A play on the expression comes a bit earlier in the scene when Hamlet asks a gravedigger whose grave is being dug, and the gravedigger, designated as CLOWN, uses a pun on the word, "lie," and playfully evades Hamlet's question. Hamlet's reply includes the line, "'tis for the dead, not for the quick . . ." (line 5.1.118).

The poignance of the expression is that it comes from Christian tradition that Christ will judge "the quick and the dead," and because Ophelia's death by drowning is "doubtful," according to the priest at the interment. Was her death an accident or suicide? The priest thinks she should not have a Christian burial, but apparently the King overruled that judgment, so she is given a partial Christian burial. According to the report of her death given by the Queen, Ophelia "fell" into the stream, but because of her insanity, she kept singing strange songs and didn't try to save herself. 

Successive versions of Hamlet were published in 1603, 1604, and 1623.

In the Nicene and Apostles' Creeds
In the Nicene Creed the phrase appears in the following passage (taken from the 1662 Book of Common Prayer).
[He] ascended into heaven,
And sitteth on the right hand of the Father.
And he shall come again with glory to judge both the quick and the dead.

In the Apostles' Creed the phrase appears in the following passage (also taken from the 1662 Book of Common Prayer).
He ascended into heaven,
And sitteth on the right hand of God the Father Almighty;
From thence he shall come to judge the quick and the dead.

Secular usage
The phrase has become commonly used as a title for works of popular culture, in some cases to describe the act of gunfighting. (See The Quick and the Dead.) Modern authors use this phrase in secular contexts because of the modern English usage of the word quick - to mean fast or smart, rather than alive - either as the result of a misunderstanding or for the purposes of creating a double entendre (i.e., quick vs. dead in the context of gun battles, wherein speed is widely believed to be a prerequisite for winning, and thereby, by implication, staying alive). In a similar vein Isaac Asimov, in explaining the term "quicksilver", jokingly suggested that modern readers probably think "the quick and the dead" is a reference to pedestrians in Los Angeles.

In English dialect, "quick" becomes "wick", meaning "alive", as in Frances Hodgson Burnett's The Secret Garden, where the garden is said to be coming alive, and in Pauline Clarke's The Twelve and the Genii (known in America as The Return of the Twelve), where the twelve wooden soldiers that the Brontë children played with so imaginatively that they actually come alive, and in the dialect used occasionally by British children's authors, Alan Garner, and William Mayne.

References

External links

16th-century neologisms
English-language idioms
Biblical phrases
Nicene Creed